Ziarat (also Romanized as Zīārat, Zeyārat, and Ziyārat) is a village in Kabgan Rural District of Kaki District, Dashti County, Bushehr province, Iran. At the 2006 census, its population was 856 in 202 households. The following census in 2011 counted 936 people in 251 households. The latest census in 2016 showed a population of 699 people in 223 households; it was the largest village in its rural district.

References 

Populated places in Dashti County